The Mercer Bears men's lacrosse team is a college lacrosse team that represents Mercer University in Macon, Georgia, United States. As of the next NCAA lacrosse season of 2023, the Bears compete in the ASUN Conference. Mercer had competed in its full-time home of the Southern Conference (SoCon) through the 2022 season, but the SoCon shuttered its men's lacrosse league after that season. Chad Surman is currently the head coach of the Bears lacrosse program, after having been named the interim head coach on August 6, 2020 and subsequently having the interim tag removed on October 27, 2020.

History

Conference affiliations
 Independent (2011-2013)
 ASUN (2014)
 SoCon (2015–2022)
 ASUN (2023–present)

Year by year results

All-time coaching records

Footnotes

References

External links
 Official website

College men's lacrosse teams in the United States
ASUN Conference men's lacrosse